Kusuo (written: 久寿雄 or 九州男) is a masculine Japanese given name. Notable people with the name include:

 (1917–1996), Japanese swimmer
 (born 1961), Japanese politician

Fictional characters
 Kusuo Saiki from The Disastrous Life of Saiki K.

Japanese masculine given names